John Argentine (died 1507) was an English physician who attended Edward V of England and later Arthur, Prince of Wales, and was Provost of King's College, Cambridge.

Life
He was the son of John d'Argentine, of Great Wymondley in Hertfordshire. The Argentines had been settled in Cambridgeshire since the Norman conquest of England. He was educated at Eton and King's College, Cambridge.

Argentine was the last known attendant of the Princes in the Tower; he noted that the princes took daily confession and penance, believing that their deaths were near. Argentine's evidence was also the basis for French declarations that the Princes in the Tower of London had been murdered and their assassin crowned as King Richard III.

Later he became physician to Prince Arthur. He ended his life as Provost of King's College, Cambridge and is buried there in the Chantry Chapel.

In popular culture
Argentine is a major character in the Channel 4 drama The Princes in the Tower in which he interrogates Perkin Warbeck to test the veracity of his claim to being Richard of Shrewsbury, 1st Duke of York. He is portrayed in the show by John Castle.

References

Notes

15th-century births
1507 deaths
15th-century English medical doctors
16th-century English medical doctors
People educated at Eton College
Fellows of King's College, Cambridge
Provosts of King's College, Cambridge
People of the Wars of the Roses
Year of birth unknown